Svetlana Guskova (born 19 August 1957) is a Moldovan runner who competed for the Soviet Union.

She was born in Mykolaiv. She won the bronze medal in 1500 metres at the 1979 European Indoor Championships. In 1982 she recorded a time of 3:57.05 minutes in the distance, as well as 8:29.36 minutes in the 3000 metres.

In 1986 she finished fifth in the 10,000 metres at the 1986 European Championships. 31:42.43 minutes was a career best time. She also recorded 15:02.12 minutes in the 5000 metres.

Achievements

References

External links

1957 births
Living people
Moldovan female middle-distance runners
Moldovan female long-distance runners
Soviet female long-distance runners
Soviet female middle-distance runners
Universiade medalists in athletics (track and field)
Sportspeople from Mykolaiv
Moldovan people of Ukrainian descent
Universiade silver medalists for the Soviet Union